Sir Malcolm David Evans,  (born 1959) is an English legal scholar. He 
is currently Principal of Regent's Park College, Oxford, England and started in 2023.

Biography
Until 2023 Evans was Professor of Public International Law at the University of Bristol. He has worked extensively on human rights issues for numerous international bodies and NGOs.

His research interests include the law of the sea and the international protection of human rights, with particular focus on the freedom of religion (for which he was knighted in 2015) and the prevention of torture.

He studied law at Regent's Park College, Oxford (1979–82 and 1983–87) primarily for undergraduate and then for doctorate. He was appointed to a lectureship at the University of Bristol in 1988 and in 1999 was appointed Professor of Public International Law. He was Head of the School of Law 2003-05 before becoming Dean of the Faculty of Social Sciences and Law from xxxx-yyyy. In 2012 he was awarded an honorary fellowship by Bangor University Law School.

He is a member of the Organization for Security and Co-operation in Europe Advisory Panel on Freedom of Religion and Belief; the International Law Association Human Rights Law and Practice Committee; and the Board of Management of the Association for the Prevention of Torture.

Among his many roles, Sir Malcolm has served as a member and, from 2011-2020 Evans chair of the United Nations Subcommittee for the Prevention of Torture. In 2015 Evans was appointed as a member of the reconstituted panel of the Independent Inquiry into Child Sexual Abuse. He was appointed Knight Commander of the Order of St Michael and St George (KCMG) in the 2016 New Year Honours for services to torture prevention and religious freedom.

In June 2022 he was named as the new Principal of his former Permanent Private Hall Regent's Park College, Oxford.

Works

Research Projects

Evaluation of the effectiveness of the national institutions under the optional protocol to the UN Convention on torture
From June 2006 to June 2009 Professor Rachel Murray held a high profile AHRC funded project which examined the implementation of the Optional Protocol to the UN Convention against Torture. Professor Malcolm Evans was the joint grant holderThe culmination of the project was the publication of the book The Optional Protocol to the UN Convention Against Torture by the Oxford University Press. Over the three years of the project, there were some 150 interviews conducted with individuals from national governments, NHRIs, national NGOs and civil society organisations of nearly 30 countries. All the world regions were covered, selecting countries that have ratified OPCAT and already had established or were in the process of establishing their NPMs.

The changing nature of religious rights in International law

Books

External links

Malcolm Evans, 'The blind eye of the law', The Guardian (Friday 13 August 2004)

References

Alumni of Regent's Park College, Oxford
Principals of Regent's Park College, Oxford
Academics of the University of Bristol
English legal scholars
English legal writers
English legal professionals
English human rights activists
Law of the sea
1959 births
Living people
Knights Commander of the Order of St Michael and St George
Officers of the Order of the British Empire
Members of the Institut de Droit International